Ram Naresh Yadav (1 July 1928 – 22 November 2016) was an Indian politician who was Chief Minister of Uttar Pradesh from 1977 to 1979. He was from Janata Party; later he joined the Congress. He also served as Governor of Madhya Pradesh from 26 August 2011 to  7 September 2016.

Personal life
He was born on 1 July 1928 at Azamgarh in Uttar Pradesh. He belonged to a middle-class family. His father was a teacher. Ram Naresh Yadav was a successful lawyer in Azamgarh court. He died on 22 November 2016 in Lucknow.

Political career
Ram Naresh Yadav was interested in social work and was close to socialist leader Raj Narain. He entered the Sixth Lok Sabha in 1977 from Azamgarh constituency. He was considered a modest and a low-profile politician.

He became Chief Minister of Uttar Pradesh on 23 June 1977, and remained on the post till 28 February 1979. On 25 February 1979, he failed to secure a vote of confidence. Banarsi Das was elected in his place and became Chief Minister.

In 2004 general elections, he contested from Azamgarh constituency on Indian National Congress ticket, but lost to Bahujan Samaj Party's Ramakant Yadav. On 26 August 2011, he was appointed Governor of Madhya Pradesh by the President of India, Pratibha Patil, on the recommendation of the UPA government.

Alleged involvement in Vyapam scam
On February 24, 2015, Madhya Pradesh Special Task Force (STF) filed an FIR against Yadav for his alleged role in the multi-crore Madhya Pradesh Professional Examination Board (MPPEB) scam (Vyapam scam). He was charged with rigging the forest guard recruitment examination, conducted by Vyapam, and booked under the Information Technology Act and the Prevention of Corruption Act. The FIR was registered after an MP High Court hearing where Chief Justice A M Khanvilkar and Justice Alok Aradhe said STF can freely proceed against any "high dignitary". Yadav moved the high court citing constitutional immunity, which subsequently in April asked STF to "observe complete protocol", the Governor being the Head of the State. The head of the special investigative team (SIT) probing the scam said that action will be taken after his retirement in September, 2016. Meanwhile, a group of lawyers filed a petition in Supreme Court of India, seeking removal of Yadav and recording his statement in the case. A bench comprising Chief Justice of India H. L. Dattu and Justices Arun Kumar Mishra and Amitava Roy has agreed to hear the petition on July 9.

Earlier in 2013, STF arrested his former OSD Dhanraj Yadav in connection with the scam. Also, his son Shailesh was an accused in the MPPEB contractual teachers' recruitment exam, and reportedly died of a brain haemorrhage in March, at Yadav's Lucknow residence.

See also
 Ram Naresh Yadav ministry (1977–79)

References

External links
 Chief Ministers of Uttar Pradesh

1928 births
2016 deaths
People from Uttar Pradesh
Chief Ministers of Uttar Pradesh
People from Azamgarh
India MPs 1977–1979
Uttar Pradesh MLAs 1977–1980
Lok Sabha members from Uttar Pradesh
R
Chief ministers from Janata Party
Governors of Madhya Pradesh
Rajya Sabha members from Uttar Pradesh
Bharatiya Lok Dal politicians
Lok Dal politicians
Indian National Congress politicians from Uttar Pradesh
Janata Party politicians
Janata Party (Secular) politicians
Politicians from Azamgarh district